2022 Kabul mosque bombing may refer to:

April 2022 Kabul mosque bombing
May 2022 Kabul mosque bombing
August 2022 Kabul mosque bombing
September 2022 Kabul mosque bombing